Again to Carthage is a novel by American author John L. Parker Jr. initially published April 1, 2008. It is the sequel to 1978 book Once a Runner.

References

Running books
Novels set in Florida
2008 American novels
Sequel novels